Budevichi is a rural locality (a village) in Posyolok Mezinovsky, Gus-Khrustalny District, Vladimir Oblast, Russia. The population was 15 as of 2010.

Geography 
Budevichi is located 35 km southwest of Gus-Khrustalny (the district's administrative centre) by road. Kuzmino is the nearest rural locality.

References 

Rural localities in Gus-Khrustalny District
Sudogodsky Uyezd